The 1906 Kentucky Derby was the 32nd running of the Kentucky Derby. The race took place on May 2, 1906. The field was reduced to six competitors when Creel was scratched.

It was the first Kentucky Derby timed to fifths of a second instead of fourths.

Full results

Winning Breeder: George J. Long; (KY)

Payout
 The winner received a purse of $4,850.
 Second place received $700.
 Third place received $300.

References

1906
Kentucky Derby
Derby
May 1906 sports events
1906 in American sports